Stefanos Tsitsipas (born 12 August 1998) is a Greek professional tennis player. He has been ranked as high as world No. 3 by the Association of Tennis Professionals (ATP), which he first achieved on 9 August 2021, making him the highest-ranked Greek player in history alongside Maria Sakkari. Tsitsipas was the champion at the 2019 ATP Finals, becoming the youngest winner of the year-end championships in eighteen years. He has won nine ATP singles titles (including two Masters 1000 championships) and has contested two major finals at the 2021 French Open and 2023 Australian Open, finishing runner-up to Novak Djokovic both times. He has a career-high doubles ranking of No. 64, achieved on 29 August 2022.

Born into a tennis family – his mother Julia Apostoli was a professional on the Women's Tennis Association (WTA) tour and his father trained as a tennis coach – Tsitsipas was introduced to the sport at age three and began taking lessons at age six. As a junior, he was ranked No. 1 in the world. He also became the third Greek player, and first Greek male in the Open Era, to win a junior Grand Slam title with a victory in the 2016 Wimbledon boys' doubles event. Tsitsipas has trained at the Patrick Mouratoglou Academy in France since 2015.

Tsitsipas won his first match on the ATP Tour in late 2017 and quickly ascended the ATP rankings the following year. He reached three tour-level finals in 2018 and won his first title at the Stockholm Open. With his runner-up finish at the 2018 Canadian Open, he became the youngest player to defeat four top ten opponents in a single tournament. Since culminating that season with an exhibition title at the Next Gen ATP Finals, Tsitsipas has become a fixture in the world's top 10. He won his first Masters 1000 event at the 2021 Monte-Carlo Masters, and defended his title in 2022. Tsitsipas was named the Greek Male Athlete of the Year for 2019.

Early life and background
Tsitsipas was born on 12 August 1998 to Apostolos Tsitsipas and Julia Apostoli (née Salnikova) in Athens. His father is Greek and he was born in Proastio, Karditsa and his mother is Russian. His maternal grandfather, Sergei Salnikov, was a Soviet footballer who played for Zenit Leningrad, Spartak Moscow and Dynamo Moscow. Both of his parents are experienced tennis players, and his mother in particular was a world No. 1 junior who had a career-high professional ranking inside the top 200 and represented the Soviet Union in the Federation Cup. His parents had been working as tennis instructors at the Astir Palace resort hotel in Vouliagmeni at the time of his birth. They originally met at a WTA tournament in Athens where his mother was competing and his father was a line judge. Stefanos has three younger siblings: two brothers Petros and Pavlos (Paul), and a sister Elisavet who is the youngest. All of his siblings are also tennis players.

With their strong backgrounds in tennis, Tsitsipas's parents got their oldest son started on tennis at a very young age. Stefanos has said, "My first memory is to be three and to hit balls with my father in the gap between lessons. I remember watching games on TV, as a baby, I can not tell you who was playing, but I remember watching." He also participated in other sports as a kid, including football and swimming. His father said Stefanos made the decision to become a tennis player himself, recalling that his son "woke up in the middle of the night" after a tournament in France at age nine and told him "Dad, I have to tell you something: I want to become a tennis player, I like the competition, I like the challenge."

Tsitsipas began taking lessons at Tennis Club Glyfada near Athens at the age of six, and has continued to train there. His father has always served as his primary coach, and he formally studied tennis coaching at the University of Athens to help train his children. In 2015, Tsitsipas also began training at the Patrick Mouratoglou Academy, splitting time between France and Greece during this period.

Junior career

Tsitsipas is a former world No. 1 junior. He began playing on the ITF Junior Circuit in 2013 at the age of 14. He did not play in any high-level Grade A tournaments until the Abierto Juvenil Mexicano in November 2014, but was able to make it all the way to the final of his second career Grade A event at the Orange Bowl a month later. Tsitsipas had entered the tournament ranked outside of the top 100 in the junior rankings. In 2015, Tsitsipas got his first opportunity to play in the junior Grand Slam tournaments. In these four events, a quarterfinal at the Australian Open was his best result. He did not win any singles finals that year, but he did have another runner-up finish at the Orange Bowl, this time losing to Miomir Kecmanović in a third set tiebreak. He finished the season as the No. 14 ranked junior in the world.

In 2016, Tsitsipas had a breakout year, reaching at least the quarterfinals of all eight tournaments that he played, including all four Grand Slams. He became the top-ranked junior in the world after winning his first Grade A title at the Trofeo Bonfiglio. Tsitsipas also won the European Junior Championships later in the year. Tsitsipas's biggest title of the season came in doubles, when he partnered with Estonian player Kenneth Raisma to win his only junior Grand Slam event at Wimbledon. He became the first male Greek to win a junior Grand Slam in the Open Era, and the second overall after Nicky Kalogeropoulos won both the French Open and Wimbledon in 1963. Besides his doubles triumph, Tsitsipas also had his two best finishes in the Grand Slam singles events that year, making the semifinals of both Wimbledon and the US Open. He ended the year as the No. 2 ranked junior in the world, behind only Kecmanović who had played several more events.

Professional career

2013–17: Top 100, ATP semifinal, top 10 victory

Tsitsipas began playing low-level ITF Futures events in Greece in 2013 shortly after turning 15, not long after he started competing on the junior tour. He qualified for his first event on the ATP Challenger Tour at the Burnie International in early 2015 while still 16 years old, but lost his only main draw match to Benjamin Mitchell. Tsitsipas won his first Futures title later that year and would go on to win a total of eleven such titles, five in singles and six in doubles, through the end of 2016. He also won his first Challenger match near the end of 2015 in Mohammedia in Morocco. Tsitsipas returned to Morocco a year later and reached his first two Challenger finals in back-to-back weeks at Mohammedia and Casablanca. This success in Africa helped him crack the top 200 later that October. Towards the end of that month, Tsitsipas was granted a qualifying wild card into the Swiss Indoors in Basel, his first ATP Tour appearance. He defeated Rajeev Ram in the opening round, but was unable to qualify after a loss to Robin Haase.

Tsitsipas played in his first ATP main draw at the 2017 Rotterdam Open, where he lost his debut match to the eventual champion Jo-Wilfried Tsonga. He also made his Grand Slam debut later that year as a qualifier at the French Open, but lost to Ivo Karlović in his first match. After losing in qualifying at the US Open, Tsitsipas won his first Challenger title in Genova. Overall, he qualified for a tour-best eight events during the season, including Wimbledon and the Shanghai Masters. However, he did not win a tour-level match until the very end of the season when he defeated fellow Next Gen player Karen Khachanov in Shanghai. At the European Open in Belgium the following week, Tsitsipas reached his first ATP semifinal as a qualifier. During the event, he upset hometown favorite and world No. 10 David Goffin for his first career top 10 victory. With this run, Tsitsipas became the first Greek player to be ranked in the top 100 of the ATP rankings, accomplishing the feat at the age of 19 and surpassed Konstantinos Economidis as the highest ranked Greek player. He also reached a high enough ranking to be named an alternate for the Next Gen ATP Finals. Tsitsipas closed out the season with another Challenger final, this time in Brest.

2018: Masters final, Next Gen champion

Tsitsipas started the year at the Qatar Open where he lost in the quarterfinals to world No. 5 Dominic Thiem, again as a qualifier. After losing in the opening round in his Australian Open debut, his best result in the rest of the early-year hard court season was another quarterfinal at the Dubai Tennis Championships. Tsitsipas's first breakthrough of the year came at the Barcelona Open during the clay court season, where he reached his first career ATP final without dropping a set. During the ATP 500 Series tournament, he defeated three top 20 players including No. 7 Thiem, before losing to world No. 1 Rafael Nadal in a lopsided match. With this result, Tsitsipas moved into the top 50 and became the second Greek to reach an ATP final after Nicky Kalogeropoulos in 1973. His performance also gained national attention in Greece, where tennis is not a widely popular sport. The following week at the Estoril Open, he reached another semifinal. He also picked up a third career top ten victory over No. 8 Kevin Anderson.

Tsitsipas closed out the clay court season by winning his first career Grand Slam match at the French Open against Carlos Taberner before losing to Thiem, the eventual runner-up. He played the next Grand Slam at Wimbledon seeded for first time at No. 31. He took advantage of the seed and produced his best result at a major tournament at the time, a fourth round loss to No. 10 John Isner.

Tsitsipas had his second big breakthrough of the year in the lead up to the US Open. After reaching the semifinals in Washington, he reached his second final of the season and first career Masters final at the Canadian Open. During the tournament, he became the youngest player to record four top ten wins in a single event, defeating No. 8 Dominic Thiem, No. 10 Novak Djokovic, No. 3 Alexander Zverev, and No. 6 Kevin Anderson in succession. He also saved match points in the latter two matches. Tsitsipas lost the final to Nadal on his 20th birthday in a closer match than their first encounter. He also climbed to No. 15 in the world.

At the US Open, Tsitsipas made his main draw debut, but was upset in the second round by fellow Next Gen player Daniil Medvedev. He cited fatigue as a factor in the loss and proceeded to exit before the quarterfinals at three of his next four tournaments as well. However, Tsitsipas was able to recover at the Stockholm Open. Playing as the third seed, he defeated second seed and No. 14 Fabio Fognini in the semifinals before winning in the final against veteran qualifier Ernests Gulbis. With the victory, he became the first Greek player to win an ATP title. Tsitsipas closed out his season at the Next Gen ATP Finals. He was the top seed at the event and was drawn with Frances Tiafoe, Hubert Hurkacz, and Jaume Munar. Tsitsipas swept his group and defeated Andrey Rublev to advance to the final against second seed Alex de Minaur. He defeated de Minaur in four sets to win the Next Gen Finals. At the end of the year, Tsitsipas was named the ATP Most Improved Player for his breakthrough season.

2019: ATP Finals champion, world No. 5

Tsitsipas began the season at the Hopman Cup alongside Maria Sakkari, making them the first team to represent Greece at the event in 17 years. They finished in a three-way tie for first in their round-robin group, having won their ties against the United States and Switzerland after being upset in their opening tie against Great Britain. They were ranked second on the tiebreak criteria and did not advance out of the group. Tsitsipas's only singles win was against Frances Tiafoe, while one of his losses was against Roger Federer. At the 2019 Australian Open, Tsitsipas reached his first major semifinal, despite having won just five Grand Slam singles matches in total the previous year. All five of his wins at the event came in four sets. He upset world No. 3 and defending champion Roger Federer in the fourth round, saving all twelve of the break points he faced in a rematch of their Hopman Cup encounter earlier in the month. After continuing his run against Roberto Bautista Agut, he easily lost to No. 2 Rafael Nadal, winning only six games. Nonetheless, his performance helped him climb to a career-best ranking of No. 12 in the world to become the highest-ranked Greek player in history.

Tsitsipas built on his Grand Slam success by reaching two finals in February in back-to-back weeks. He won his second career title at the Open 13 in Marseille over Mikhail Kukushkin before finishing runner-up to Federer at the Dubai Tennis Championships. His performance in Dubai put him in the top 10 of the ATP rankings for the first time. Tsitsipas closed out the early year hard court season with a career-best result in doubles, finishing runner-up to the Bryan brothers at the Miami Open with Wesley Koolhof. Tsitsipas also had an excellent clay court season. He won his first career clay court title a month later at the Estoril Open after defeating Pablo Cuevas in the final. The following week, he made another Masters final at the Madrid Open. During the event, he defeated No. 4 Alexander Zverev and No. 2 Rafael Nadal in the quarterfinals and semifinals respectively before finishing runner-up to No. 1 Novak Djokovic. This was his first win over Nadal in four attempts. Nadal defeated Tsitsipas a week later at the Italian Open. Nonetheless, Tsitsipas rose to No. 6 in the world after this series of tournaments. At the French Open, Tsitsipas was upset in the fourth round by Stan Wawrinka, in a marathon five set match that ended 6–8 in the final set.

Despite a strong first half of the season, Tsitsipas began to struggle following the French Open. He lost his opening round matches at Wimbledon and the US Open to Thomas Fabbiano and Andrey Rublev respectively, and both Masters tournaments in August. Despite this, he reached a career-best ranking of No. 5 in early August. Tsitsipas ultimately rebounded beginning in October. He defeated Zverev again at the China Open en route to finishing runner-up to No. 5 Dominic Thiem. He then made two semifinals at the Shanghai Masters and the Swiss Indoors, losing to other top five players again in No. 4 Daniil Medvedev and No. 3 Roger Federer. At the end of the season, Tsitsipas qualified for the ATP Finals for the first time, where he was placed in a round-robin group with Nadal, Zverev, and Medvedev. He defeated both Medvedev 
and Zverev to advance to the knockout stages after two matches. He lost his last group match to Nadal. In the semifinals, Tsitsipas defeated Federer to setup a final against Thiem. Tsitsipas won the championship in a tight match that ended in a third set tiebreak to become the youngest winner of the year-end championship since Lleyton Hewitt in 2001. He finished the season at No. 6 in the world.

2020: French Open semifinal 
He entered the 2020 Australian Open seeded 6th in the men's bracket, but failed to repeat his success of 2019, losing in the 3rd round to Milos Raonic. He then entered the ABN AMRO World Tennis Tournament seeded 2nd, but failed to live up to his seed as he lost in the round of 16 to Aljaž Bedene. He recovered quickly to defend his title at the Open 13 tournament, winning his 5th ATP title, recording in the process 4 wins in a row without dropping a set, and defeating Félix Auger-Aliassime in the final. The following week he entered the Dubai Tennis Championships as the second seed behind Novak Djokovic. He recorded 4 wins in a row, reaching the final for the second successive year, where he lost in straight sets to the World No. 1.

At the US Open, he was seeded 4th in the men's bracket. He beat Albert Ramos Viñolas and Maxime Cressy without dropping a set before losing to Borna Coric in the third round despite having six match points and being a break up in the 5th set.

At the French Open, he was seeded 5th and reached the semifinal, defeating Grigor Dimitrov and Andrey Rublev, before losing to Djokovic in five sets.

Tsitsipas was unable to defend his 2019 ATP Finals title. He was eliminated from the season ending event with a 1–2 record during the round-robin portion of the competition, having defeated Andrey Rublev, but losing to Dominic Thiem and Rafael Nadal.

2021: French Open final, Masters 1000 champion, world No. 3

Tsitsipas started his 2021 Australian Open campaign with a comfortable straight sets win over Gilles Simon, before surviving a five set thriller with Thanasi Kokkinakis. He then beat Mikael Ymer in straight sets before being given a walkover by an injured Matteo Berrettini. In the quarterfinals, Tsitsipas became only the second player along with Fabio Fognini at the 2015 US Open to beat Rafael Nadal in a grand slam match from two sets to love down. He eventually lost in the semifinals to Daniil Medvedev. In Rotterdam, Tsitsipas lost in the semifinals to the eventual champion Andrey Rublev.

In April, Tsitsipas won his first Masters 1000 title at the Monte-Carlo Masters, after defeating Aslan Karatsev, Cristian Garín, Alejandro Davidovich Fokina, Dan Evans and Andrey Rublev. In doing so, Tsitsipas became the first Greek player in history to win a Masters title. In May, Tsitsipas defeated Cameron Norrie in straight sets to win the 2021 Lyon Open and his seventh career title.

At the French Open, Tsitsipas beat Pablo Carreño Busta and Daniil Medvedev to reach his second consecutive French Open semifinal and third consecutive Grand Slam semifinal. He beat Alexander Zverev in five sets to become the first Greek player in history to reach a major final. Tsitsipas achieved a career-high ranking of World No. 4 by advancing to the championship match. There, he lost to world No.1 Novak Djokovic in five sets despite holding a two sets to love lead.

Tsitsipas suffered an early exit at Wimbledon, losing to Frances Tiafoe in the first round.  He took his revenge for the Wimbledon loss by defeating Tiafoe in the second round at the 2020 Olympics. He became the first Greek man to win a singles match at the Olympic Games with his first round win over Phillip Kohlschreiber since Augustos Zerlandis in 1924. He lost in the third round to Ugo Humbert of France in three sets. At the US Open, Tsitsipas defeated Andy Murray in 5 sets and Adrian Mannarino in 4 sets to reach the third round. In the third round, he was defeated in 5 sets with a final set tiebreak by World No. 55 and 18 year-old Carlos Alcaraz. At the 2021 BNP Paribas Open he reached the quarterfinals, beating Pedro Martínez, Fabio Fognini and Alex de Minaur before losing to Nikoloz Basilashvili. At the ATP Finals, Tsitsipas lost in straight sets to Andrey Rublev before withdrawing from the tournament due to an elbow injury.

Bathroom Break Controversy
At the US Open, he faced a backlash for taking extended bathroom breaks. In the Cincinnati Masters before the US Open, during a match against Alexander Zverev, Tsitsipas landed in a controversy for taking an extended toilet break after Zverev complained to the umpire about the situation. In the US Open, the controversy became worse, after Tsitsipas took a toilet break twice, when he was losing his first round match against Andy Murray, and even asked to stop the match while down in one of the games. Murray complained after the second toilet break, claiming that Tsitsipas's breaks are too long and change the momentum of the game. He claimed to have "lost all respect" for Tsitsipas, and later, after losing the match, wrote on Twitter, claiming that it takes Tsitsipas twice as long to go to the toilet as it takes Jeff Bezos to fly into space.

Doubles wildcards misuse controversy
In doubles, Stefanos has partnered with his brother Petros Tsitsipas in seven tournaments where they have received six wildcards in doubles and they have lost five times out of seven in the first round since the beginning of the year. The misuse of wildcards in the case of the brothers have been brought up by players and fans.

The Tsitsipas brothers received yet again their second Grand Slam and seventh wildcard for the year at the 2021 Wimbledon Championships. They also received the eight wildcard at the 2021 Hamburg European Open where Stefanos was the runner-up in 2020 and received also a wildcard for the 2021 edition in singles.

2022: 250th match win, first title on grass
At the 2022 Australian Open, Tsitsipas reached the semifinals for the third time, where he faced Daniil Medvedev in a rematch of the previous year's semifinal. He lost in four sets, and received a coaching violation when his father Apostolos was caught coaching in Greek.

Tsitsipas became the first man born in 1998 or later to get 200 career tour-level wins after defeating Laslo Đere in the first round at the 2022 Abierto Mexicano Telcel tournament.

Stefanos Tsitsipas successfully defended his Monte-Carlo Masters title against Spaniard Alejandro Davidovich Fokina in two sets to capture his second ATP Masters 1000 title.

At the 2022 Italian Open he reached the quarterfinals, defeating Grigor Dimitrov in the second round, saving two match points in the process and Karen Khachanov in the round of 16. In the quarterfinals he defeated Jannik Sinner to reach his third straight semifinal at a Masters level, earning a tour-leading 30 wins for the season. Next he defeated Alexander Zverev, his second consecutive win on clay, for a place in the final. Tsitsipas and Zverev were the only players to reach the semifinals at all three Masters 1000 tournaments on clay in the season. In the finals, he lost to Novak Djokovic.

After some early losses in the Stuttgart Open and the Halle Open, Tsitsipas won his first title on grass courts after receiving a last minute wildcard at the Mallorca Open, defeating Roberto Bautista Agut in three tight sets.

At the 2022 Wimbledon Championship, Tsitsipas lost in the third round to Nick Kyrgios in four sets. In a fiery match, Tsitsipas was fined $10,000 for two code violations.

He reached his third Masters 1000 final of the season but lost to the in-form and lowest ranked (No. 152) champion in Masters history Croatian Borna Coric.
At the 2022 US Open, Tsitsipas was seeded fourth. He was defeated by qualifier Daniel Elahi Galán in four sets in the first round, although Tsitsipas saved eight match points.

In October, Tsitsipas reached the final of Astana Open, Kazakhstan, which he lost in straight sets to Novak Djokovic. Next he reached his seventh final at the Stockholm Open but he was defeated by Holger Rune in straight sets. He lost in the second round in Vienna. He recorded his 60th win for 2022 defeating Tommy Paul in the quarterfinals of the 2022 Rolex Paris Masters to reach his fifth Masters semifinal for the season. In the semifinals, he lost to Novak Djokovic in three sets.

At the 2022 ATP Finals he lost again to Djokovic, his ninth consecutive loss against the five-time season finale champion, and Andrey Rublev, thus not being able to get past the round robin stage.

Tsitsipas ended the year with a tournament win, the 2022 Mubadala World Tennis Championship.

2023: Australian Open Final
He recorded his 250th win at the 2023 United Cup defeating Grigor Dimitrov. At the 2023 Australian Open, Tsitsipas defeated Quentin Halys, Rinky Hijikata, Tallon Griekspoor, Jannik Sinner, Jiri Lehecka, and Karen Khachanov on his way to the final. The final was his second Grand Slam final following the 2021 French Open. In both finals, Tsitsipas lost to Novak Djokovic.

At the Australian Open he progressed to the final, losing in straight sets to Novak Djokovic. This final was noteworthy because the win led to Djokovic equalling Rafael Nadal's record 22 major wins, and if Tsitsipas had won, he would have ascended to the world number 1 ranking for the first time.

Playing style

Tsitsipas is an aggressive baseliner capable of an all-court player style as well. He aims to hit powerful groundstroke winners and has a particularly strong forehand using an Eastern grip. His forehand is particularly useful in finishing points off of the first serve, as combined with his big serve, he uses his high topspin rate to pull opponents off the court for winners, or go to the net more often than typical baseline players. One of his weaknesses is to overhit and make unforced errors while trying to hit winners. He also struggles returning serve against players with strong kick serves on the backhand side, a weakness he has worked to improve through usage of blocked and slice returns on his backhand.

His favourite shot is his one-handed backhand, a rarity in modern tennis. His forehand is still his stronger swing, however. He experimented with both one-handed and two-handed backhands in his youth, but chose to go with the former at around eight years old because both of his parents as well as his idol Roger Federer all use a one-handed backhand, and also because it felt more natural. His favourite shot is the backhand down-the-line.

Tsitsipas is regarded as having an all-court game. His favourite surface is grass and Wimbledon is his favourite tournament. Tsitsipas also excels on clay, having grown up playing on that surface in Greece. He has said, "I feel very confident when I step on the dirt. I always show my best tennis on this surface." Tsitsipas has also done well on hard courts, reaching two Masters finals (Canada, Cincinnati) and three Australian Open semifinals.

Former British No. 1 players Greg Rusedski and Annabel Croft have both praised Tsitsipas's on-court demeanor in conjunction with his style of play. Rusedski in particular has said that "[Tsitsipas] reminds me a little bit of Björn Borg. He does all the right things, he is spectacular as a tennis player and was just sensational with the way he was so calm and composed and he didn't blink when it came to the crunch. He has the competitive nature of Andy Murray, but he also has a calmness which reminds me of Roger Federer."

Rivalries

Daniil Medvedev 

Stefanos Tsitsipas and Daniil Medvedev have faced each other 11 times since 2018, with Medvedev leading the rivalry, 7–4. They are considered to be two of the best tennis players of their generation. Medvedev won his first five matches against Tsitsipas, but Tsitsipas has won four of their last six.

Personal life

Tsitsipas studied at an English-language school in his youth. He can speak English, Greek, and Russian. He is a supporter of Greek football club AEK Athens. Tsitsipas's hobbies include vlogging. He hosts his own YouTube channel where he posts videos of his travels. He was in a relationship with New York based research analyst Theodora Petalas from 2019-2022 

Tsitsipas credits his mother's twin sister, who was also a professional tennis player in the Soviet Union, with helping the family's finances so that he could afford to travel with his father to train and compete during his junior career. His maternal grandfather Sergei Salnikov was an Olympic gold medal-winning member of the Soviet national football team and a former manager of FC Spartak Moscow.

During a Futures tournament in Crete, Tsitsipas nearly drowned while swimming at sea on an off-day. After a current carried him away from the shore, his father noticed what had happened and helped save his life. He attributes his confident approach of "[feeling] absolutely zero fear on the court" to the perspective he gained from this experience.

He is a Greek Orthodox Christian.

Tsitsipas has expressed interest in promoting the sport of tennis in Greece, where he has said "tennis is not very popular." After his finals appearance at the 2018 Barcelona Open, he commented that his success was helping him achieve this goal. Of his performance and the attention it received, he stated, "Many people were talking about [the final] and I had plenty of interviews that I did on big channels in Greece for big media centres. It got people's attention... It makes me motivated to do even better in the future, and become even more popular... I hope to inspire more people to play tennis in Greece."

Career statistics

Grand Slam tournament singles performance timeline

Current through the 2023 Australian Open.

Grand Slam tournament finals

Singles: 2 (2 runner-ups)

Year-end championship finals

Singles: 1 (1 title)

ATP Masters 1000 finals

Singles: 6 (2 titles, 4 runner-ups)

Doubles: 1 (1 runner-up)

Records

Open Era records

Notes

References

External links

 
 
 
 
 
 
 

1998 births
Living people
Greek male tennis players
Tennis players at the 2020 Summer Olympics
Grand Slam (tennis) champions in boys' doubles
Wimbledon junior champions
Sportspeople from Athens
Greek people of Russian descent
Olympic tennis players of Greece